Georgina Klitgaard ( Berrian; July 3, 1889/1893 – January 12, 1977) was an American artist. Klitgaard was known for panoramic landscape paintings of scenic New York from a bird's-eye view perspective. Her work was reviewed in the Los Angeles Times, on April 14, 1929, and in The Art Digest, on November 1, 1929. She painted three murals in United States Post Offices during the Great Depression.

Education
Born Spuyten Duyvil, New York (now The Bronx, New York) in 1889 or 1893 as Georgina Berrian, she graduated from Barnard College. She also studied art at the National Academy of Design. She married Danish writer Kaj Klitgaard (1888-1954)
in 1919. The couple had two sons: Peter Klitgaard (1921-1976) and Wallace Berrian Klitgaard (1937-2006). They lived in Bearsville, New York, near an artist colony in Woodstock, New York. She was among the List of Guggenheim Fellowships awarded in 1933.

Georgina Klitgaard died in Ulster County, New York on January 12, 1977, one month after the death of her elder son, Peter.

Career

She painted the New Deal era mural Pelham Landscape (1941) at the United States Post Office at Pelham, Georgia.  Klitgaard's mural The Running of the Hambletonian Stake at the United States Post Office (Goshen, New York) (a property listed on the National Register of Historic Places) was controversial for featuring harness racing, a subject deemed unworthy for public art. Postal murals of the era were supposed to focus on local history and contemporary life, but the Treasury Department's Section of Painting and Sculpture strongly objected to her intention to paint the track, asking her to paint a local landscape instead. The community indicated its strong support of the track, and she was allowed to paint it. In Jan 1975 she became a member of the National Society of Literature and the Arts.

References

External links

Photo of Georgina Klitgaard Archives of American Art

American women painters
American muralists
20th-century American painters
Barnard College alumni
National Academy of Design alumni
1977 deaths
Year of birth uncertain
Painters from New York City
Artists from the Bronx
People from Woodstock, New York
Federal Art Project artists
Section of Painting and Sculpture artists
20th-century American women artists
Women muralists